Adolphus Acquah Robertson Turkson (12 September 1933 – 21 June 1993), better known as Ato Turkson, was a Ghanaian composer and musicologist.

Education
Turkson was born in Winneba in  southern Ghana. He studied music at the University of Ghana, graduating in 1964. He undertook further study in composition at the Franz Liszt Academy of Music in Budapest, Hungary, studying under Rezső Sugár. He gained a master's degree  and doctorate in musicology at Northwestern University in Illinois. His doctoral dissertation focussed on the traditional music of the Efutu people.

Academic career
Turkson spent most of his academic career at the University of Ghana. He was also visiting scholar at the University of Cologne (1978) and Portland State University (1982).

Composition
According to Daniel Avorgbedor, Turkson's compositions were "largely rooted in 20th-century avant-garde techniques", in particular in his use of atonality and serialism. Most of his early piano works were of an educational nature. His later compositions included indigenous elements, inspired partly by his earlier research into Efutu music. Most of his works were published by the University of Ife Press in Nigeria. His best-known work is Three pieces for flute and piano (1968).

Selected compositions
 Trio, op. 3 (1965)
 Six easy pieces for piano, op. 4 (1965)
 Serenade no. 1 for string orchestra, op. 5 (1965)
 String quartet, op. 6 (1966)
 Serenade no. 2 for string orchestra, op. 7 (1966)
 Te Deum, op. 8 (1966)
 Oboe quintet, op. 9 (1966)
 Three pieces for flute and piano, op. 14 (1968)
 Three pieces for oboe and piano, op. 15 (1968)
 Sonata for violin, op. 16.
 Elements I, op. 19 (1970)
 Symphony, op. 20 (1970)
 Symphony, op. 21 (1970)
 Fanta Lyric for Flute Solo, op. 22 (1970)
 Six piano pieces, op. 12 (1977)

Published works
 
 
  (as Adolphus Turkson)
 
  (as Adolphus Turkson)

References

Ghanaian composers
Ghanaian musicologists
1933 births
1993 deaths
University of Ghana alumni
Academic staff of the University of Ghana
Franz Liszt Academy of Music alumni
Northwestern University alumni
20th-century composers
20th-century musicologists